Bellmunt (Sant Pere de Torelló) is a mountain of Catalonia, Spain. It has an elevation of 1,246 metres above sea level.
This mountain dominates the landscape of the Plain of Vic.

See also
Sub-Pyrenees
Mountains of Catalonia

References

Mountains of Catalonia
Emblematic summits of Catalonia